Shypit (translation as "Sizzle”) is a waterfall located on the Pylypets River, about  from the village of Pylypets, Mizhhiria Raion, Zakarpattia Oblast of western Ukraine The waterfall is  high.

See also
 The legend of the waterfall Shypit
 Waterfalls of Ukraine
 http://www.turystam.in.ua/en/ 1 and 2

References 

Waterfalls of Ukraine